Imma inaptalis is a moth in the family Immidae. It was described by Francis Walker in 1866. It is found on Borneo.

Adults are brown, the forewings with a pale ochraceous zigzag middle line and an ochraceous marginal line pale, as well as a triangular pale ochraceous costal spot near the tip, and a smaller pale ochraceous spot joining the marginal line near the interior angle.

References

Moths described in 1866
Immidae
Moths of Asia